Maria Papadopoulou (born September 8, 1980) is a Cypriot former swimmer who specialized in butterfly events. She set a Cypriot record of 1:01.67 to earn a bronze medal in the 100 m butterfly at the 2001 Mediterranean Games in Tunis, Tunisia.

Papadopoulou made her first Cypriot team at the 2000 Summer Olympics in Sydney, where she competed in the women's 100 m butterfly, held on the first day of preliminaries. She broke a 1:02 barrier to top the third heat with a time of 1:01.64, but finished only in thirty-second place.

At the 2004 Summer Olympics in Athens, Papadopoulou qualified again for the women's 100 m butterfly by eclipsing a FINA B-standard entry time of 1:01.76. She challenged seven other swimmers on the second heat, including five-time Olympian Mette Jacobsen of Denmark. She edged out Iceland's Kolbrún Yr Kristjánsdóttir to pick up a fourth spot by 0.32 of a second in 1:02.01. Papadopoulou failed to advance into the semifinals, as she placed twenty-ninth overall on the first day of preliminaries.

Papadopoulou is a former member of the swimming team for Arizona Wildcats, and a graduate of management information systems at the University of Arizona in Tucson, Arizona.

References

External links
Player Bio – Arizona Wildcats

1980 births
Living people
Cypriot female swimmers
Olympic swimmers of Cyprus
Swimmers at the 2000 Summer Olympics
Swimmers at the 2004 Summer Olympics
Female butterfly swimmers
Sportspeople from Limassol
Arizona Wildcats women's swimmers
Commonwealth Games competitors for Cyprus
Swimmers at the 1998 Commonwealth Games
Swimmers at the 2002 Commonwealth Games
Swimmers at the 2006 Commonwealth Games
Mediterranean Games bronze medalists for Cyprus
Swimmers at the 2001 Mediterranean Games
Mediterranean Games medalists in swimming